Sheffield Township is one of thirteen townships in Tippecanoe County, Indiana, United States. As of the 2010 census, its population was 3,865 and it contained 1,454 housing units.

Geography

Cities and towns
 Dayton
 Lafayette (east edge)

Extinct towns
 Wyandot at

Adjacent townships
 Perry Township (north)
 Madison Township, Clinton County (east)
 Ross Township, Clinton County (east)
 Washington Township, Clinton County (east)
 Lauramie Township (south)
 Wea Township (west)
 Fairfield Township (northwest)

Cemeteries
The township contains these five cemeteries: Baker, Holladay, Newcomer, Salem and Wyandot.

Major highways
  Interstate 65
  US Route 52

Airports and landing strips
 Miller Field

School districts
 Tippecanoe School Corporation

Political districts
 Indiana's 4th congressional district
 State House District 41
 State Senate District 22

References
 United States Census Bureau 2007 TIGER/Line Shapefiles
 United States Board on Geographic Names (GNIS)
 United States National Atlas

External links
 Indiana Township Association
 United Township Association of Indiana

Townships in Tippecanoe County, Indiana
Lafayette metropolitan area, Indiana
Townships in Indiana